Lomovoy (masculine), Lomovaya (feminine), or Lomovoye (neuter) is the name of several rural localities (settlements, selos, and villages) in Russia:
Lomovoye, Arkhangelsk Oblast, a settlement in Kholmogorsky Selsoviet of Plesetsky District of Arkhangelsk Oblast
Lomovoye, Lipetsk Oblast, a selo in Lomovskoy Selsoviet of Chaplyginsky District of Lipetsk Oblast
Lomovoye, Oryol Oblast, a selo in Lomovsky Selsoviet of Zalegoshchensky District of Oryol Oblast
Lomovoye, Tver Oblast, a village in Likhoslavlsky District of Tver Oblast